Saddleback Hill is a mountain in Dukes County, Massachusetts. Middle Pond is located east of Saddleback Hill.

References

Mountains of Massachusetts
Mountains of Dukes County, Massachusetts